1982–83 was the 36th season of the Western International Hockey League.

Standings

 Nelson Maple Leafs 		50		33	14	 3							 69
 Trail Smoke Eaters		50		30	18	 2							 62
 Kimberley Dynamiters		50		22	27	 1							 45
 Cranbrook Royals		50		21	27	 2							 44
 Elk Valley Blazers		50		20	30	 0 							 40
 Spokane Chiefs			50		19	29	 2							 40

Playoffs

Semi finals

Best of 7

 Nelson Maple Leafs defeated Cranbrook Royals 4 games to 2 (6-1, 2-5, 8-4, 5-7, 6-0, 6-5).
 Trail Smoke Eaters defeated Kimberley Dynamiters.

Final

In the "Best of 7" series final, the Trail Smoke Eaters defeated the Nelson Maple Leafs 4 games to 0 (3-1, 4-2, 5-1, 8-2) to advance to the 1982-83 Western Canada Allan Cup Playoffs.

References 

Spokane Chronicle - Nov 6, 1982

Western International Hockey League seasons
WIHL
WIHL